Bonar-e Azadegan (also Romanized as Bonār-e Āzādegān) is a village in Darvahi Rural District, Ab Pakhsh District, Dashtestan County, Bushehr Province, Iran. At the 2006 census, its population was 854, in 163 families.

References 

Populated places in Dashtestan County